
The West Central Conference is a high school athletic conference made up of 11 high schools (in two divisions) in Minnesota.

North Division
Melrose Area High School
Minnewaska Area High School
Morris Area Schools
Paynesville High School
Sauk Centre High School

South Division
Atwater-Cosmos-Grove City High School
Benson High School
BOLD High School
Lac Qui Parle Valley High School
Montevideo High School
Yellow Medicine East High School

External links
 WCC home page

References

Minnesota high school sports conferences